Bodeli railway station (station code: BDE) is the main railway station in the Indian city of Bodeli in Chhota Udaipur district of Gujarat state.

Trains

 59117/18 Pratapnagar–Chhota Udaipur Passenger
 59119/20 Pratapnagar–Chhota Udaipur Passenger
 59121/22 Pratapnagar–Alirajpur Passenger
 79455/56 Vadodara–Chhota Udaipur DEMU

See also
 Vadodara Junction railway station
 Pratapnagar railway station
 Chhota Udaipur railway station
 Alirajpur railway station

References

Railway stations in Chhota Udaipur district
Vadodara railway division